Uta no Ki – Gift is an album recorded by the female Japanese pop artist Watanabe Misato. It was released on December 6, 2000 by Sony Music Entertainment.

Track listings

Sotsugyo (=Graduation)
Sakura no Hana no Saku koro ni (=When Cherry Blossoms bloom)
Boku de Nakutcha (=I've gotta do by myself)
Sugao (=Natural face)
Sincerely [Sincerely]
Welcome
37.2 °C (Yume miru you ni Utai tai (=I want to sing like dreaming))
Runner
Green Green
Itsuka Kitto (=Someday, surely)
The Rose
My Love Your Love (Tatta Hitori sika inai Anata he (=To the one and only you))
Gift

External links
Sony Music Entertainment - Official site for Watanabe Misato.
Album Page - Direct link to page with song listing and music samples.

2000 albums
Misato Watanabe albums